Local elections were held in Marikina on May 10, 2010 as part of that year's Philippine general election. In this election, the mayoralty and vice mayoralty were contested, along with the sixteen seats in the city council and the city's two seats in the House of Representatives.

Vice Mayor Marion Andres was defeated by the Liberal representative from the second district Del De Guzman. Andres's running mate, Thaddeus Santos Jr. was also defeated in his race with Jose Fabian Cadiz being elected as vice mayor. First district representative and future mayor Marcelino Teodoro was reelected to a second term as the representative for the first district, with Miro Quimbo being elected as the representative for the second district.

The election determined the composition of the sixth city council.

The candidates for mayor and vice mayor with the highest number of votes wins the seat; they are voted separately, therefore, they may be of different parties when elected.

Mayoral election results

Vice Mayoral election results

Congressional election results

1st District

2nd District

City Council elections 
Each of Marikina's two legislative districts elects eight councilors to the city council. The eight candidates with the highest number of votes wins the seats per district.

Summary

District 1 

|-bgcolor=black
|colspan=5|

District 2 

|-bgcolor=black
|colspan=5|

References

2. "Official Election Results for Local Positions in Marikina." Marikenya.com. 2010-05-14. Retrieved 2010-05-14.

2010 Philippine local elections
Elections in Marikina
Politics of Marikina
2010 elections in Metro Manila